Schutte Bekker (born 19 October 1971) is a South African former rugby union player.

Playing career
Bekker represented  at the 1989 and 1990 Craven Week tournaments for schoolboys.

Bekker played in one test match for the Springboks, as a replacement against   during the 1997 Tri Nations Series at Loftus Versfeld in Pretoria. He also played in two tour matches, scoring three tries for the Springboks.

Test history

See also
List of South Africa national rugby union players – Springbok no. 639

References

1971 births
Living people
South African rugby union players
South Africa international rugby union players
Leopards (rugby union) players
Blue Bulls players
Bulls (rugby union) players
Rugby union players from Mpumalanga